Home is the sixth studio album by American country music singer Dierks Bentley. It was released on February 7, 2012 via Capitol Records Nashville. The album produced four singles—"Am I the Only One", the "title track", "5-1-5-0", and "Tip It On Back"—on the US Billboard Hot Country Songs chart between 2011 and 2012, with the first three of those reaching number one.

Critical reception
AllMusic's Stephen Thomas Erlewine gave the album a positive review and rated it as three stars out of five, saying that it "resonates longer and louder than Feel That Fire even when it shares much of the same radio-ready DNA." In 2017, Billboard contributor Chuck Dauphin placed one track from the album on his top 10 list of Bentley's best songs: "Am I the Only One" at number nine.

Chart performance
The album debuted at number seven with 55,000 copies on the US Billboard 200 chart. As of February 2014, the album has sold 294,000 copies in the United States.

Track listing

Personnel
Credits adapted from Allmusic and album liner notes.

Technical and production
Luke Wooten - engineer, mixing, producer
Gary Paczosa - engineer, mixing
Brandon Bell - engineer, assistant
Brett Beavers - producer
Jon Randall - producer
Kyle Manner - digital editing
Andrew Mendelson - mastering
Hank Williams - mastering
Production assistant - Greg Mangum, Scott Johnson

Design
Art direction - Joanna Carter
Art producer - Michelle Hall
Assistants - Jon Ashley, Jeremy Brown, Evan Bradford, Leslie Richter
Design - Glen Nakasako
Photography - James Minchin III, Ryan Silver

Musicians
Accordion - Mike Rojas
Acoustic guitar - Bryan Sutton, Jaren Johnston, Brett Beavers, Jim Beavers, Steven Sheehan, Jedd Hughes
Banjo - Bryan Sutton
Bass guitar - Jimmy Carter, Michael Rhodes
Dobro - Randy Kohrs
Drums - Steve Brewster, Shannon Forrest
Programming - Brett Beavers
Electric guitar - Luke Wooten, Jedd Hughes, Tom Bukovac, J. T. Corenflos, Kenny Greenberg, Rob McNelley
Fiddle - Sam Bush, Larry Franklin, Andy Leftwich
Guitjo - Bryan Sutton
Mandolin - Andy Leftwich, Bryan Sutton, Tim O'Brien
Pedal steel guitar - Gary Morse, Scotty Sanders, Dan Dugmore
Percussion - Jaren Johnston, Steve Brewster, Eric Darken
Piano - Mike Rojas
Lead Vocals - Dierks Bentley
Duet Vocals - Karen Fairchild on "When You Gonna Come Around"
Background Vocalists - Jaren Johnston, Jon Randall, Chris Stapleton, Evie Bentley, Caylin Cervetti, Perry Coleman, Morgane Hayes, Lona Heins, Russell Terrell

Charts

Weekly charts

Year-end charts

Certifications

References

2012 albums 
Albums produced by Brett Beavers
Dierks Bentley albums
Capitol Records Nashville albums